Inaugurated on 12 July 1984, Sri Lanka Army Seva Vanitha Unit functions with the main objective of providing welfare facilities to the family and relatives of service personnel who died, went missing in action or were injured whilst serving in the army in addition to empowering the families of the serving army personnel. Traditionally the organisation functions under the leadership of the wife of the serving Commander of the Army, and the members are the spouses of army officers as well as female officers. The organisation extends to 22 regimental branches functioning under the patronage of the wives of the respective regimental commanders.

Projects 
Sri Lanka Army Seva Vanitha Unit conducts various welfare projects such as Viru Kekulu pre-schools, daycare centres, welfare shops, bakeries and salons, with the committed contribution of the dedicated membership. Construction of houses, endowment of educational scholarships and assisting in times of natural disasters, are done at both organisational and regimental levels. The volunteer service extended by the spouses of the army officers whilst multitasking at their roles as wives, mothers and professionals, is an immense strength to Sri Lanka Army.

Branches 
All 22 regiments of the Sri Lanka Army have a Seva Vanitha branch. Those branches are led by the wives of respective regimental commanders. The society of the wives of respective regimental commanders are also known as Regimental Ladies' Clubs.

List of Presidents

External links 

 Official web page
 Official web page of Sri Lanka Army

References 

Sri Lanka Army
Military units and formations established in 1984
Military of Sri Lanka